PS Princess of Wales was a passenger vessel built for the Great Eastern Railway in 1878.

History

The ship was built by the London and Glasgow Engineering and Iron Shipbuilding Company  for the Great Eastern Railway and launched on 4 February 1878.  She was launched by Miss Isabel Adams, daughter of the Locomotive Superintendent of the Great Eastern Railway Company, and named after the Princess of Wales, Alexandra of Denmark.

She was placed on the Harwich to Rotterdam and Antwerp route.

She was broken up in 1896.

References

1878 ships
Steamships of the United Kingdom
Paddle steamers of the United Kingdom
Ships built on the River Clyde
Ships of the Great Eastern Railway